Proliga is the Indonesian professional top level competition for volleyball clubs. It is organised by Persatuan Bola Voli Seluruh Indonesia (PBVSI) or Indonesian Volleyball Association. There are both men's Proliga and women's Proliga competitions. Both were founded in 2002.

Men's competition

Women's competition 

Volleyball
Indonesia
Volleyball in Indonesia
Sports leagues established in 2002
Professional sports leagues in Indonesia